Cup-bap is a food truck offering that consists of bap (rice) in a paper or plastic cup with a variety of toppings. Created in the 2000s for Korea street food, cup-bap has become a popular quick meal or snack for students from private cram schools known as hagwons (Korean pronunciation: [haɡwʌn]) in the neighborhood of Noryangjin.

Definition and history 

In the streets of Noryangjin, many students would come out to eat at the same time which had been causing long lines at restaurants. Noryangjin had only offered very basic quick snacks such as hot dogs, so food trucks with cup-bap then filled the demand for quick, cheap, and more satisfying meals with rice, meat, and egg. Food trucks are able to quickly fill cup-bap orders, because they stir-fry the ingredients in advance in a large frying pan; when the cup-bap is ordered, the pre-cooked toppings are put in a cup with rice and egg. Because cup-bap is convenient to eat on the go as well as a more satisfying meal than other quick snacks, it grew in popularity with students. More food trucks started offering cup-bap along with a wider variety of toppings to satisfy various tastes.

Types 

Some of the most popular kinds of cup-bap are stir-fried kimchi, Bibimbap, bulgogi, pork-belly & ham, chicken teriyaki, chicken mayonnaise, tuna mayonnaise, etc.

Main consumers 
In Korea, cup-bap is a food truck offering that academy students eat for a snack or as a meal on the Noryangjin Institutes Street, and as it became more popular, new franchises opened near the schools. The main consumers are students and others who need a quick and cheap meal.

Korean food has gained huge popularity in Vietnam due to the influence of the Korean wave. Among them, sales of products such as tteok-bokki, cup-bap, and japchae has risen by 38 percent. Cup-bap has also been very successful In Cambodia.

Disadvantages and problems 

 Cup-bap nutrition has both benefits and drawbacks. It's a meal made up of meat with eggs on top of rice with relatively few vegetables available. So although it's a more nutritious meal than some basic snacks, it's high in carbohydrates, fat, and salt while lacking in vitamins and minerals. Without much fiber, it doesn't always digest well. In general, sodium and sugar content are high.
 Hygienic management is challenging because many ingredients are stored pre-cooked; so bacteria that could cause enteritis is more likely to develop than in freshly prepared food truck offerings.
 Under South Korea's law on the labeling of origin of agricultural and fisheries products, the country of origin for beef, pork and chicken in cup-bap must be listed on the menu, but few food trucks follow this law. Cup-bap food trucks are not authorized businesses by the Metropolitan Government, so they aren't obligated to abide by the law, and they don't pay taxes.

Commercialization in food companies 
Starting from Noryangjin's food truck cup-bap, you can now find shops that sell cup-bap all over the streets of Korea, plus dried cup-bap as instant food. Convenience stores and famous Korean food companies are also launching a variety of cup-bap products. In particular, Korea's leading convenience store GS25 and food company Ottogi are making great efforts to expand its presence abroad. One-person households in Korea have increased significantly and it is now considered more acceptable to have dinner alone; as such more convenience stores and food companies are offering cup-bap.

See also 
Cupbop, a restaurant franchise in the United States and Indonesia that serves cup-bap and is a namesake of the cuisine.

References 

Korean rice dishes